In shogi, Spearing the Sparrow (雀刺し or スズメ刺し suzumezashi) is one of the substrategies of the Fortress (Static Rook) class of openings. The strategy is basically an edge attack on the first file if played by Black or the ninth file if played by White. The player's rook characteristically moves to the respective edge file to support an attack there along with the right knight, the edge pawn, the right lance, and the bishop.

See also

 Fortress opening
 Morishita System
 Akutsu Rapid Attack Yagura
 Waki System
 Central Rook Fortress
 Right Fourth File Rook#Yagura vs Right Fourth File Rook
 Static Rook

Bibliography

勝又清和 『消えた戦法の謎』 毎日コミュニケーションズ 1995年

External links

 Quest of the Lost Systems: 
 Yagura: Suzume-zashi
 Yagura: R-2i Formation
 Shogi Maze: Yagura: Suzumizashi Strategy

Shogi openings
Fortress openings